Firsoff is an impact crater in the region called Meridiani Planum in the Oxia Palus quadrangle of Mars, located at 2.66°N  latitude and 9.42°W  longitude.  It is 90  km in diameter. It was named after British astronomer Axel Firsoff, and the name was approved in 2010.

Parts of the crater display many layers, as do some of the other craters in the region.  Many places on Mars show rocks arranged in layers. Rock can form layers in a variety of ways.  Volcanoes, wind, or water can produce layers.  There is much evidence that at least some of the layers seen on Mars especially in Firsoff crater involve groundwater.

There are mounds in the crater that may have formed from springs.  They show breccia sometimes a pit at the top.  Some of the mounds are lined up along straight fractures.  The mound's composition and shape suggest water came out of the mounds and then minerals were precipitated.

A detailed discussion of layering with many Martian examples can be found in Sedimentary Geology of Mars.

At a conference in May 2014, Firsoff Crater was picked to be one of 26 locations being considered for the 2020 Rover.  Some of the layers in the crater contain sulfates which have a good chance of preserving traces of life. This Rover will look for signs of life and gather samples for return to Earth in another mission. A microscope will look for cells and other signs of life. It will also test a device to extract oxygen from the carbon-dioxide atmosphere of Mars.  This is a technology needed for future human exploration.

Gallery

See also
 Climate of Mars
 Geology of Mars
 Groundwater on Mars
 Impact crater
 Impact event
 Life on Mars
 List of craters on Mars
 Ore resources on Mars
 Planetary nomenclature
 Water on Mars

References

Further reading
 Grotzinger, J. and R. Milliken (eds.).  2012.  Sedimentary Geology of Mars.  SEPM.

Oxia Palus quadrangle
Impact craters on Mars